Louis Charles Richard Duncombe-Jewell (10 September 1866 – 1947), born Louis Charles Richard Jewell, was a soldier, special war correspondent of The Times and The Morning Post, sportsman and sometimes poet. He was a champion of the Cornish language, having been born at Liskeard in Cornwall. He assumed the additional surname Duncombe in accordance with his grandmother's will in 1895. His parents were members of the Plymouth Brethren, which when they moved to South London brought him into contact with Aleister Crowley. The two remained lifelong associates. Duncombe-Jewell lived at Crowley's Scottish residence 'Boleskine' for several years from 1903. He later converted to Catholicism.

Military service
Formerly a Lieutenant in the 3rd Volunteer Battalion of the Royal Fusiliers, he represented The Times in Spain during the rumours of an impending Carlist rising in 1898–99, and served as a Special War Correspondent for the Morning Post newspaper in South Africa, the same paper that also employed Winston Churchill, with the 3rd Division South African Field Force.

Writing career
Duncombe-Jewell was a noted historian, novelist and verse-writer, and made numerous contributions to the Pall Mall Gazette, and many other publications of the period. He was editor of Armorial Cornwall, founder and Hon. Sec. Celtic-Cornish Society, and leader of the Cornish Language Movement. He was also an expert in the works of occultist, Aleister Crowley who spent some time in Cornwall.

Interest in Cornish Nationalism
During the 1890s, Duncombe-Jewell flirted with the Neo-Jacobite Revival. He wrote a piece on the movement for The Albemarle, which was critical of the more political Legitimist Jacobite League of Great Britain and Ireland, but favourable towards the more artistic Order of White Rose.

In 1901 he founded the Cornish Celtic Society, and at the Pan Celtic Congress of 1901 made a spirited plea for recognition of Cornwall as a Celtic nation.

He was a flamboyant individual who appeared at the 1902 Bangor Eisteddfod as the Cornish delegate sporting a traditional Cornish costume of his own design. He was made a bard by the Welsh Gorsedd in 1904 and took the bardic name of Bardd Glas (the Blue Bard) because he was clad from his tights to his cap in this colour. Also involved with Cowethas Kelto Kernuak was Henry Jenner who later retired to Cornwall following a distinguished career as librarian at the British Museum. Together with Jenner, he was jointly responsible for Cornwall gaining its acceptance as a Celtic nation by the Pan Celtic Congress of 1904. Later Jenner helped found the Cornish Gorseth.

The Cowethas Kelto Kernuak organisation petered out, when in 1903, Duncombe Jewell left Cornwall to live at Boleskine near Loch Ness and the colourful and enigmatic Bardd Glas progressively turned his attention away from Cornish Celtic culture to Welsh.

Works
(Some publications under the name Ludovick Charles Richard Duncombe-Jewell or L. C. R. Cameron)

The Handbook to British Military Stations Abroad (1898)
Otters and Otter-hunting, L. Upcott Gill, 1908. 
 Wild Foods of Great Britain: where to find and how to cook them, George Routledge & Sons Ltd, 1917,  (1977 reprint)
 Minor Field Sports, : London George Routledge & Sons N/D, 1920,  (2005 reprint)
 Rod, Pole & Perch: Fishing & Otter Hunting Sketches, Martin Hopkinson & Company, London, 1928,  (2006 reprint)
 Love-Lies-Bleeding: lyrics in Old French verse-forms (1929)
 The Lady of the Leash: A Sporting Novel., London, Lincoln Williams, 1935 
 The Hunting Horn: What to Blow and How to Blow it, London, Kohler & Son N/D

References

1866 births
1947 deaths
Bards of Gorsedh Kernow
Bards of the Gorsedd
Writers from Cornwall
Cornish nationalists
British war correspondents
British Plymouth Brethren
People from Liskeard
Royal Fusiliers officers
Celtic studies scholars
Cornish-speaking people
Neo-Jacobite Revival